Fencer may refer to:

 Fencer, a person who participates in the sport of fencing
 Fencer, a person who makes fences
 Fencer, the device which energizes an electric fence
 Fencer, the NATO reporting name of the Sukhoi Su-24 combat jet
 HMS Fencer (D64)
 The Fencer, a 2015 Estonian-Finnish-German film directed by Klaus Härö

See also
 Fence (disambiguation)